Gonzalo Rovira (born April 7, 1988 in Corrientes, Argentina) is an Argentine footballer currently playing for Textil Mandiyú in the Argentinean Torneo Federal A

Teams
  San Lorenzo 2009
  Deportes La Serena 2010
  San Lorenzo 2010
  Deportivo Quito 2011–2012
  Douglas Haig 2012-2013
  Gimnasia y Tiro 2013-2014
  Colegiales 2014–2015
  Textil Mandiyú 2015–

External links
 Profile at BDFA

1988 births
Living people
Argentine footballers
Argentine expatriate footballers
San Lorenzo de Almagro footballers
Deportes La Serena footballers
S.D. Quito footballers
Expatriate footballers in Chile
Expatriate footballers in Ecuador
Association football forwards
People from Corrientes
Sportspeople from Corrientes Province